Golborne (pronounced  or ) is a town in the Metropolitan Borough of Wigan, in Greater Manchester, England. Along with the nearby village of Lowton, it had a population of 24,041.

Within the boundaries of the historic county of Lancashire, Golborne owes most of its growth to mining and textile manufacturing but since the decline of these industries it has expanded in population. There was also significant agricultural activity, and many farms still belong to the families who originally owned them.

History

Toponymy
The name Golborne derives from the Old English golde and burna, and means "stream where marsh marigolds grow". The earliest settlements in the present-day town were on banks of the Millingford Brook, hence its name being derived from a water course where calendula grew. Golborne has been recorded in ancient documents as Goldeburn in 1187, Goldburc in 1201, Goseburn and Goldburn in 1212 and Golburne in 1242. Golborne and Gowborne were 16th-century spellings.

Early history
A settlement at Golborne has existed since at least the time of the Domesday book. The manor was held in two moieties, half by the Lords of Lowton, and the half by the Golbornes up to the reign of Henry III, and later by various families including the Fleetwoods and Leghs.

The old Manor of Golborne stood to the north side of the village, giving its name to a public house on Church Street (now demolished). The manor and its lands extended as far as St Luke's Church in Lowton, and also gives its name to Manor Avenue and Manor Court.

The Venerable Bede wrote in his Historia ecclesiastica gentis Anglorum of a well near Golborne sacred to St. Oswald's memory. This well had been suggested as the site where Penda, the pagan king of Mercia, slew the Christian King Oswald, later St Oswald, in the Battle of Maserfield, in 642. It is more generally accepted though that the site of that battle was some considerable distance to the southwest, near Oswestry.

Holcroft Hall, now a farm, was the home of Colonel Blood, who, during the reign of Charles II, attempted to steal the Crown Jewels. King Charles was amused by Blood's audacity and pardoned him. Blood married Maria Holcroft of Holcroft Hall at Newhurch Church against the will of her father.

In 1648 the Battle of Red Gap was fought by the old road south from Golborne (probably the Red Bank area of Newton le Willows) during the 2nd Civil War. The Scots on the side of Charles I had advanced into England. Oliver Cromwell, leader of the Roundhead Army intercepted the Scots at Preston and, in a series of running battles between Preston, Wigan and Warrington, of which Red Gap was one, he defeated the Scots even though his army was outnumbered by ten to one.

A local legend speaks of a knight who slayed a dragon and was granted land and a manor, supposedly Goulbourne. There is a tumulus in fields near the golf known as Castle Hill where tradition says Alfred buried his treasure, but it has never been found. Castle Hill is also said to be haunted by a White Lady, who drifts in front of oncoming traffic.

Recent history

The town grew during the Industrial Revolution as the mining industry expanded. On 18 March 1979 there was a methane explosion at the town's colliery caused by an electrical spark, which took the lives of ten miners. Of the eleven present, only one survived. The colliery closed in 1989. The location of the former colliery is known locally as the 'Bonk'  which originated in the migration of Welsh miners to North West coal mines: 'Bonk' derives from the Welsh: banc	 1. bank n.m. (banciau) mound n.m. (bencydd) bank n.m. (bencydd) hillock n.m. (bencydd) ('a' to 'o' mutation) – the spoil heap of the colliery. It is now used as a business park. The closure of the colliery led to the loss of employment for a large proportion of Golborne's population as well as people from nearby towns such as Abram, Lowton and Ashton-in-Makerfield. Unemployment problems have been mostly eradicated in recent years with the introduction of new industries which have created new jobs, for example, the creation of Stone Cross Industrial Park.

There is a campaign to reopen the town's main line railway station – Golborne South. As part of Greater Manchester's Transport Initiative Fund package, a station at Golborne would be reinstated, probably on the site of the original station off the A573 in the centre of town. Golborne's branch line station – Golborne North – was closed in 1952.

Governance
Under the Local Government Act 1972, in force from 1 April 1974, the urban district of Golborne, established in 1894 (and expanded in 1933 by adding part of Leigh Rural District which included Kenyon), was split, with the parts of Culcheth and Newchurch becoming the civil parish of Culcheth and Glazebury in the Warrington district in Cheshire, and the rest of the district becoming part of the Metropolitan Borough of Wigan of Greater Manchester.

Demography

Landmarks
The parish church of Golborne is St Thomas' Church, in the Deanery of Winwick, Diocese of Liverpool. Founded in 1829, the church building has a clock tower that is still in operation and is still heard chiming on every hour. There is also a graveyard surrounding the building.

Peter Kane Square and memorial clock is situated in the town centre and is named in honour of boxer Peter Kane.

On Sunday 19 March 2006 the Rector of Golborne, the Rev Robert Williams, officiated at a service in Kidglove Road at what was the entrance to Golborne Colliery. The service was attended by ex-miners and their families, and was the fruition of two years of fund-raising to erect the  stone, commissioned in memory of the men and women who worked and died at Golborne Colliery between its opening in 1880 and its closure in 1989.

The memorial was conceptualised by the Golborne Ex-Miners Association, who staged a series of concerts to help towards the cost of the stone. Funding was also received from a community chest grant from Wigan Metropolitan Borough Council, Alpla (UK) Ltd of Golborne, and the Coal Industry Social Welfare Organisation. Former miner Dean Mitchell landscaped the memorial site.

Notable people

 Johnny Hart (1928-2018), professional football player and manager
 Paul Hart (born 1953), professional footballer and son of Johnny Hart
 William 'Billy' Hibbert (1884–1949), professional footballer
 Peter Kane (1918–91), blacksmith and professional boxer
 Bert Llewellyn (1939–2016), professional footballer
 Philip McGinley (born 1981), actor
 Jimmy Pennington (born 1939), professional footballer
 Jack Rigby (1924–97), professional footballer
 Danny Tickle, (born 1983), professional rugby league player
 Brian Simpson (born 1953), Member of the European Parliament 1989–2014
 Davey Boy Smith (1962–2002), professional wrestler
 Thomas Billington (aka: Dynamite Kid, 1958–2018), professional wrestler
 Chris Washington (born 1989), comedian.
 Matty Hughes (born 1992), professional footballer.
 Charlie Hughes (born 2003), professional footballer.

See also

Listed buildings in Golborne
List of mining disasters in Lancashire

References

External links

 The death of mining in Wigan

Towns in Greater Manchester
Unparished areas in Greater Manchester
Geography of the Metropolitan Borough of Wigan